Wallis Annenberg Stadium is a soccer-specific stadium located on the campus of University of California, Los Angeles. The stadium is home to the UCLA Bruins men's and women's soccer programs, and replaced Drake Stadium as the home venue for the two programs.

Construction on the stadium was funded with private donations, and began in the Fall of 2016. Ahead of the 2018 men's and women's seasons, the stadium opened. The stadium is named for Wallis Annenberg of the Annenberg Foundation. A capacity crowd of 2,237 saw the Bruins defeating the Cal Golden Bears on September 24, 2022.

Significant events
 November 9–18, 2018 – First, second and third round matches of the 2018 NCAA Division I Women's Soccer Tournament vs. San Jose State, Minnesota and NC State, respectively
 November 15–24, 2019 – First, second and third round matches of the 2019 NCAA Division I Women's Soccer Tournament vs. Lamar, Clemson and Wisconsin, respectively
 November 12, 2021 – First round match of the 2021 NCAA Division I Women's Soccer Tournament vs. UC Irvine
 November 18, 2021 – First round match of the 2021 NCAA Division I Men's Soccer Tournament vs. UC Santa Barbara
 October 30, 2022 – New attendance record of 2,446 was set on senior day at Wallis Annenberg Stadium with the UCLA women's soccer team ranking No. 1

References

External links 
 UCLA facilities listing

UCLA Bruins men's soccer venues
UCLA Bruins women's soccer venues
University of California, Los Angeles buildings and structures
College soccer venues in California
Soccer venues in Los Angeles
Sports venues in Los Angeles County, California
2018 establishments in California
Sports venues completed in 2018